The concept of shattered sets plays an important role in Vapnik–Chervonenkis theory, also known as VC-theory. Shattering and VC-theory are used in the study of empirical processes as well as in statistical computational learning theory.

Definition

Suppose A is a set and C is a class of sets. The class C shatters the set A if for each subset a of A, there is some element c of C such that

 

Equivalently, C shatters A when their intersection is equal to A'''s power set: P(A) = { c ∩ A | c ∈ C }. 

We employ the letter  C  to refer to a "class" or "collection" of sets, as in a Vapnik–Chervonenkis class (VC-class).  The set A is often assumed to be finite because, in empirical processes, we are interested in the shattering of finite sets of data points.

Example

We will show that the class of all discs in the plane (two-dimensional space) does not shatter every set of four points on the unit circle, yet the class of all convex sets in the plane does shatter every finite set of points on the unit circle.

Let A be a set of four points on the unit circle and let C be the class of all discs.

To test where C shatters A, we attempt to draw a disc around every subset of points in A. First, we draw a disc around the subsets of each isolated point. Next, we try to draw a disc around every subset of point pairs. This turns out to be doable for adjacent points, but impossible for points on opposite sides of the circle. As visualized below:

Because there is some subset which can not be isolated by any disc in C, we conclude then that A is not shattered by C. And, with a bit of thought, we can prove that no set of four points is shattered by this C.

However, if we redefine C to be the class of all elliptical discs, we find that we can still isolate all the subsets from above, as well as the points that were formerly problematic. Thus, this specific set of 4 points is shattered by the class of elliptical discs. Visualized below:

With a bit of thought, we could generalize that any set of finite points on a unit circle could be shattered by the class of all convex sets (visualize connecting the dots).

Shatter coefficient

To quantify the richness of a collection C of sets, we use the concept of shattering coefficients (also known as the growth function). For a collection C of sets ,  being any space,  often a sample space,  we define
the nth shattering coefficient of C as

 is the largest number of subsets of any set A  of n points that can be formed by intersecting  A with the sets in collection C.

Here are some facts about :
  for all n because  for any .
 If , that means there is a set of cardinality n, which can be shattered by C.
 If  for some  then  for all .
The third property means that if C cannot shatter any set of cardinality N then it can not shatter sets of larger cardinalities.

Vapnik–Chervonenkis class

The VC dimension of a class C is defined as

or, alternatively, as

Note that 

If for any n there is a set of cardinality n which can be shattered by C, then  for all n and the VC dimension of this class C is infinite.

A class with finite VC dimension is called a Vapnik–Chervonenkis class or VC class. A class C'' is uniformly Glivenko–Cantelli if and only if it is a VC class.

See also
Sauer–Shelah lemma, relating the cardinality of a family of sets to the size of its largest shattered set

References
.

.

External links
Origin of "Shattered sets" terminology, by J. Steele

Empirical process
Computational learning theory